Arenga micrantha, also known as the Tibetan sugar palm, is a species of flowering plant in the family Arecaceae, found in the cloud forests of Tibet, Bhutan, and North-East India. Its natural habitat is subtropical or tropical moist lowland forests, between 1400 and 2150 m. It is threatened by habitat loss.

It is a solitary palm that grows up to 2m in height and 15 cm in diameter, with 3m long leaves and 1m long inflorescences. It requires pollination to fruit, and rarely flowers. It is probably the most cold hardy species in the genus.

It is sometimes used as material to build shelters.

References

micrantha
Flora of China
Endangered plants
Flora of Bhutan
Plants described in 1988
Taxonomy articles created by Polbot